The Bourne–Morton Canal is an archaeological feature to the north-east of Bourne in Lincolnshire, England. In old maps and documents, it is known as the Old Ea. It was a 6.5 kilometer artificial waterway linking the dry ground at Bourne to either the coast near Pinchbeck or a navigable estuary in the area. There is now no visible trace.

Excavation at Cross Drove in the 1990s suggests that the canal was around 2.6 metres deep at high tide, 6 metres wide at the base, and 10 to 12 metres wide at the surface. It appears to date back to Roman times, although very little is known.

Despite the extensive agricultural reworking of the area, the route can still be traced with cropmarks, which are straight between Bourne and Morton Fen.

The alignment can be traced on web-based satellite photography services between

The line of modern Spalding Road from near Queens Bridge to the bottom of Meadow Drove follows the southern bank of the alignment, which can then be observed across the fields as cropmarks. Several farm buildings in Barnes Drove and Morton Fen lie alongside the alignment, causing speculation about the antiquity of their sites.

There is also speculation concerning the location of the south-western end of the canal. It would make little sense to stop short of the dry ground to the west of the Car Dyke or the Roman Road in Bourne, and projecting the line of Spalding Road takes us to The Austerby, across the line of the modern Eau and south of the Abbey Lawn. This area has been extensively re-engineered for the Castle, Abbey and railway, and is now under 20th-century housing.

References

Archaeology Commissions Report 4314 'FMP Bourne/morton Canal', 1993, recording existing traces

External links

Private research web site Bourne Archive: suggests using google earth to trace cropmarks
Web page about the modern Eau, includes line of Bourne-Morton canal

Roman sites in Lincolnshire
Canals in Lincolnshire
Bourne, Lincolnshire